ESPNscrum was an online news site based in United Kingdom dedicate to providing the latest news in rugby union. It provided live minute-by-minute updates on major international and club games and kept in-depth statistics on every international rugby player and nation.

Founded in 1997 by EMAP, it began as an independent website under the domain "scrum.com". It was later sold to Sportal in 1999. After its collapse in 2001, the site was set for closure but was saved by a consortium of rugby lovers who bought the site for £100,000 from Sportal and ran the site under the name "Scrum Ltd", paying for the site's maintenance from their own pocket for the next six years.

In August 2007, American sports media company ESPN bought the site in collaboration with Walt Disney Internet Group.

The rugby section on the Spanish-language website ESPN Deportes.com was branded ESPNscrum in May 2009.

By April 2015, ESPN's Rugby section was run by ESPNscrum, but ESPNscrum was no longer its own website.

References

External links 
 
 
 
 

Internet forums
British sport websites
Rugby union mass media
Scrum
Internet properties established in 1997
Rugby football websites
Defunct British websites